Gelincik may refer to:

 Gelincik, Dicle, Turkey
 Gelincik, Emirdağ, Turkey
 Gelincik, Mazgirt, Turkey
 Gelincik, İskele, or Vasili, Famagusta, Cyprus